Jonathan Jack Sealy (born 4 May 1987), commonly known as Jack Sealy, is an English-born Hong Kong professional footballer who currently plays for Hong Kong Premier League club HKFC.

Early years
Jack Sealy is the son of former Queen's Park Rangers and Eastern player Tony Sealy. Jack is of Barbadian descent through his paternal grandfather. He was born in England and but later became a naturalised Hong Konger. From an early age he represented the Hong Kong Football Club and by the age of 12 was playing football in adult social leagues, the Yau Yee League, before making the step up to the Hong Kong Second Division at the age of 16.

Club career

HKFC
Jack Sealy played for HKFC from 1999 (promoted to the first team in 2005), with his father Tony Sealy as his coach. He scored an own goal in the 0–6 loss to Kitchee on 23 September 2010. He missed a scoring chance and then scored an own goal in the 2–4 defeat to Fourway Rangers on 17 December 2010.

Sun Hei
Jack Sealy signed for Sun Hei in June 2011. He made his debut for Sun Hei on 3 September 2011 in the league match against Kitchee.

South China
Jack Sealy moved to South China in July 2012 to further his career. On 29 September 2012, Dhiego Martins scored in stoppage time from an inch-perfect cross from Sealy, helping the club beat rivals Kitchee 1–0. Sealy scored his first league goal for South China against Yokohama FC Hong Kong on 15 February 2014.

Changchun Yatai
On 27 December 2015, South China announced that Jack Sealy had signed with Chinese Super League club Changchun Yatai on a five-year contract. He left for his new club in January 2016.

Tai Po
On 19 January 2018, Tai Po announced that Sealy had signed with the club, returning to Hong Kong after two years abroad.

Pegasus
On 22 July 2018, it was reported that Sealy had left Tai Po for fellow Hong Kong Premier League club Pegasus.

Southern
On 2 July 2019, Sealy moved back to the island, signing a contract with Southern.

On 17 July 2022, Sealy left the club.

HKFC
On 7 August 2022, it was reported that Sealy would return to HKFC after 11 years.

International career
On 6 December 2011, Sealy trained with the Hong Kong national football team for the first time, to prepare for the 2012 Guangdong-Hong Kong Cup. He claims that he and his father both have special feelings for Hong Kong football and his father is very supportive of him joining the Hong Kong national team. He is willing to apply for a HKSAR passport to play for Hong Kong. He made his debut with Hong Kong on 28 December 2011 against Guangdong. In the match, he made a long pass from which Cheng Siu Wai scored the equalising goal. The match ended 2–2. He obtained Hong Kong passport in March 2013 and he became eligible to represent Hong Kong in international "A" matches. He made his debut for Hong Kong on 6 September 2013 against Myanmar, however, the match was not recognised as an international 'A' match by FIFA, as Myanmar made more than 6 substitutions. His first international 'A' match for Hong Kong should be on 10 September 2013 against Singapore

Honours

Club
HKFC
Hong Kong Second Division: 2005–06, 2009–10

Sun Hei
Hong Kong Senior Shield: 2011–12

International
Hong Kong
Guangdong-Hong Kong Cup: 2012, 2013

Career statistics

Club
As of 12 May 2013

International

References

External links

1987 births
Living people
Footballers from Greater London
Hong Kong footballers
Hong Kong international footballers
English footballers
English emigrants to Hong Kong
Hong Kong people of English descent
Hong Kong people of Barbadian descent
English people of Barbadian descent
Hong Kong First Division League players
Hong Kong Premier League players
Hong Kong FC players
Sun Hei SC players
South China AA players
Chinese Super League players
Changchun Yatai F.C. players
Tai Po FC players
TSW Pegasus FC players
Southern District FC players
People with acquired permanent residency of Hong Kong
Association football fullbacks
Association football midfielders
Hong Kong expatriate footballers
Hong Kong expatriate sportspeople in China
Naturalized footballers of Hong Kong
Hong Kong League XI representative players